The Subprefecture of Ermelino Matarazzo is one of 32 subprefectures of the city of São Paulo, Brazil.  It comprises two districts: Ermelino Matarazzo and Ponte Rasa. It hosts the second largest campus of University of São Paulo in the city.

References

Subprefectures of São Paulo